Lotus Gemology is a gemology laboratory located in Bangkok, Thailand. It was founded in 2014 by Richard W. Hughes and Wimon Manorotkul and their daughter, E. Billie Hughes. 

Richard Hughes and Wimon Manorotkul began their gemological careers in Bangkok in 1979. Since then, the family team has had over 200 publications to their name. This includes eleven gemology books that they have either authored, co-authored, or edited. In 2017, Lotus Gemology published Ruby & Sapphire: A Gemologist's Guide, which extensively covers the gem species corundum.

When Lotus Gemology first opened, they specialized in testing only ruby, sapphire and spinel. Due to customer demand, they began testing other colored gemstones in 2018.

Lotus Gemology gemologists often do speaker events and have delivered over a hundred lectures and classes around the world on various gemological topics. In 2019, Shanghai's Tongji University created a special exhibit dedicated to Lotus Gemology's photography. 2020 saw Van Cleef & Arpels' L’École, School of Jewelry Arts run an exhibit in Hong Kong featuring photomicrographs from Lotus Gemology's E. Billie Hughes.

Laboratory Services
Lotus Gemology issues reports on all types of gemstones with the exception of diamonds and pearls. For certain types of gemstones (mostly ruby, sapphire and spinel), opinions on geographical origin may be given. All gems are tested for treatments of any kind.

Laboratory Equipment
Lotus Gemology is equipped with gemological and research microscopes, photomicrography stations for both normal and ultraviolet photography, micro Raman spectroscopy and standard Raman analysis, UV-Vis-NIR and Fourier-Transform Infrared Spectroscopy (FTIR), and Energy Dispersive X-Ray Fluorescence (ED-XRF) and Laser-Induced Breakdown Spectroscopy (LIBS) for chemical analysis. A full set of standard gemological instruments is also employed.

Education
Hyperion Inclusion Database is a public, keyword-searchable database of inclusions in gemstones to help gemologists better understand and identify the gems they work with.

Lotus Gemology also has created a free reference search engine for gems and gemology. Dubbed the "Four Treasures" after the Chinese phrase for writing implements, this database contains over 6000 references on gemological topics. The majority of references relate to ruby, sapphire, spinel and jade.

LotusGemology.com contains dozens of open-access articles, such as articles that track the prices of ruby, sapphire, spinel and jade at auction.

Memberships
The laboratory and/or its staff are members of the gem trade organizations Accredited Gemologists Association (AGA), the Gemmological Association of Great Britain (Gem-A), the invitation-only Gemstone Industry & Laboratory Conference (GILC), the International Colored Stone Association (ICA) and the Thai Gem and Jewelry Traders Association.

Founders
The following founders information is based in part on that at LotusGemology.com:

Richard W. Hughes
Involved in gemology since 1979, he has authored or co-authored nearly 200 papers and many books on gemology. Richard has received industry awards for both his writings and research work. These include:

 Co-winner of the Edward J. Gübelin Most Valuable Article Award from Gems & Gemology magazine in 2004
 Richard T. Liddicoat Journalism Award from the American Gem Society in 2004
 Antonio C. Bonanno Award for Excellence in Gemology from the Accredited Gemologists Association in 2010
 In 2013, the Association Française de Gemmologie (AFG) named Richard one of the 50 most important figures that have shaped the history of gems since antiquity.
 Visiting professorship at Shanghai's Tongji University in 2016
 For his photo of a jade market in China, Richard was named Photographer of the Year by the Gemmological Association of Great Britain in 2018

Wimon Manorotkul
Wimon Manorotkul has been involved in gemology since 1979, as a teacher, lab gemologist and photographer. She qualified as a Fellow of the Gemmological Association of Great Britain with Distinction in 1985 and her gem and field photography has graced  publications including Ruby & Sapphire: A Collector's Guide, Ruby & Sapphire: A Gemologist's Guide and Inside Out: GEM•ology Through Lotus-Colored Glasses.

E. Billie Hughes
Billie Hughes qualified as a Fellow of the Gemmological Association of Great Britain in 2013. She has travelled to gem-producing localities, including Thailand, China, Myanmar, Sri Lanka, Madagascar and East Africa, and has lectured on gemology in Thailand, France, the UK, and USA. A photomicrographer, she created Lotus Gemology's Hyperion database, the world's first fully searchable inclusion database that now contains over a thousand images. Her photomicrographs are regularly featured in Gems & Gemology's "G&G Microworld" column. Some of Billie's awards include:
 Photographer of the Year from the Gemmological Association of Great Britain in 2016. Her photos have also won awards in 2014, 2017, 2018 and 2019.
 Clemson University Light Imaging Facility’s Hooked on Microscopy Competition • 2018 • Winner of People’s Choice Award
 Close Up Photographer of the Year • 2019 • Finalist, Micro category
 Nikon Small World Photomicrography Competition • 2019 • 18th place out of 2,000+ entries from nearly 100 countries.

Select Bibliography

Books
 Inside Out • GEM•ology Through Lotus-Colored Glasses (2020), 
 Ruby & Sapphire • A Gemologist's Guide (2017), 
 Ruby & Sapphire • A Collector's Guide (2014), 
 The Book of Ruby & Sapphire by J.F. Halford-Watkins (2012; from an unpublished manuscript from 1935; edited by Richard W. Hughes), 
 Terra Spinel • Terra Firma by Vladyslav Y. Yavorskyy & Richard W. Hughes (2010), 
 Ruby & Sapphire (1997), 
 Corundum (1990),

Papers
 Hughes, E.B. & Perkins, R. (2019) Madagascar sapphire: Low-temperature heat treatment experiments. Gems & Gemology, Vol. 55, No. 2, Summer, pp. 184–197.
 Hughes, E.B., Koivula, J.I., Manorotkul, W., Renfro, N. and Hughes, R.W. (2019) Spinel inclusions: An exercise in aesthetics. InColor, No. 43, pp. 66–73.
 [various labs, including Lotus Gemology] (2019) Squeezing sapphire: Pressure-heated sapphire.
 Lotus Gemology (2015) Lotus Gemology lab alert for oiled gems. InColor. Spring, Issue 28, pp. 18–23.
 Hughes, R.W. and Emmett, J.L. (2004) Fluxed up: The fracture healing of ruby. The Guide, Vol. 23, Issue 5, Part 1, Sept.–Oct., pp. 1, 4–9. [won the Richard T. Liddicoat Journalism Award from the American Gem Society]
 Emmett, J.L., Scarratt, K., McClure, S.F., Moses, T., Douthit, T.R., Hughes, R., Novak, S., Shigley, J.E., Wuyi Wang, Bordelon, O., Kane, R.E. (2003) Beryllium diffusion of ruby and sapphire. Gems & Gemology, Vol. 39, No. 2, Summer, pp. 84–135. [voted ‘Article of the year’ by the magazine’s readers]
 Hughes, R.W., Galibert, O., Bosshart, G., Ward, F., Thet Oo, Smith, M., Tay Thye Sun, Harlow, G.E. (2000) Burmese jade: The inscrutable gem. Gems & Gemology, Vol. 36, No. 1, Spring, pp. 2–26.

References

External links
 

Gemological laboratories
Companies based in Bangkok